Epic Battles is an out-of-print collectible card game produced by Score Entertainment that was released in September 2005. Gameplay attempts to emulate a traditional fighting game experience and features characters and attacks from several different franchises. There are four separate sets of cards available that feature characters from Mortal Kombat, Street Fighter, and Tekken, plus an unreleased Darkstalkers set.

Gameplay
Gameplay is divided into turns of five steps. Unlike most collectible card games, players may take any action on any turn. The goal of the game is to "damage" an opponent with attacks, forcing them to discard cards from their deck. When a player runs out of cards, they lose the game.

Each turn begins with both players drawing three cards. Next, both players set any events they have drawn face down on the table. They may flip these events at the time that the requirements are met (requirements are stated on the event itself). Next, the "aggressor" may play an attack. The other player may play a block to stop this attack or can take damage from it. If the aggressor can "link" their first attack to another one, then they may do so (how this is done is explained below in 'Card Types'). Once the aggressor has ended their combo, the other player has the option of attacking. Battle goes back and forth until both players pass in a row. Once this happens, both players discard cards from their hand down to three and the turn ends.

Many cards have an energy cost to play. This cost is paid for from the energy pile. The energy pile is built by placing played attacks cards, whether or not they are blocked, into the pile. To pay a cost, a player discards cards from their energy pile for the value of the cost (i.e. a cost of two is paid by discarding two cards from the energy pile).

Card types
Characters
A card which represents the combatant whose role the player is currently assuming. Character cards may also have special abilities attached to them. Any attack that names a character can only be played if the player is using that character (i.e. "Elena's Healing" can only be played if a player is playing as Elena).
Attacks
Attacks are the most common type of card. Attack cards have an archetype, either High Attack or Low Attack, and then a subtype, which can include Punch, Kick, Throw, Projectile, Weapon, Special, or even Bite. Attacks list both the amount of damage they deal and an energy cost. Generally, but not always, the higher damage attacks cost more energy than the lower energy ones. Attacks can also be linked to form combos and list what type of attack they link to on the right side of the card. An attack will link to either an archetype or a subtype, giving a player extra options when linking.
Blocks
Blocks are played to prevent (or reduce) the amount of damage from attacks. Some have energy costs and special abilities, but not all.
Events
Events are random things that may happen in a fight. They are initially played face-down and are turned over and played when the requirements on the card are met.

Sets

See also
Mortal Kombat Kard Game
Universal Fighting System

External links
pic Battles Trading Card Game | BoardGameGeek
Vicious Mortal Kombat - Epic Battles Card Database
CCG Library - Epic Battles - Mortal Kombat Card Database
CCG Library - Epic Battles - Street Fighter Card Database
CCG Library - Epic Battles - Tekken Card Database

Card games introduced in 2005
Collectible card games
Works based on Mortal Kombat
Works based on Street Fighter
Works based on Tekken